, formerly , is a Shinto shrine located at the far western end of Shijō Street, approximately 1.3 kilometers south of the Arashiyama district of Kyoto. It is home to a spring at the base of the mountain, Arashiyama, that is believed to be blessed.

It is said that during the move of the capital from Nara to Kyoto, a noble saw a turtle bathing under the spring's waterfall and created a shrine there. It is one of the oldest shrines in the Kyoto area, its founding extending back to 700 CE. The restorative properties of the spring bring many local sake and miso companies to the shrine for prayers that their product will be blessed.

The shrine also serves a kinpaku miki (gold leaf filled blessed sake) during hatsumōde.

History
The shrine became the object of Imperial patronage during the early Heian period. In 965, Emperor Murakami ordered that Imperial messengers were sent to report important events to the guardian kami of Japan. These heihaku were initially presented to 16 shrines including the Matsunoo Shrine.

Shofuen Gardens 
After a new set of buildings was finished in 1973, modernist garden designer Mirei Shigemori was brought in to design new garden areas at Matsuo Taisha. Shigemori designed three new garden areas, which were completed in 1975:

 Kyokosui no Niwa 曲水の庭 (Garden of the Winding Stream) with a clear flowing stream in the style of the Heian period
 Jōko no Niwa 上古の庭 (Prehistoric Garden), a setting of large stones that references the ancient Mt. Matsuo shrine stone behind the shrine buildings
 Horai no Niwa 蓬莱の庭 (Garden of Horai), a garden referencing the land of Horai in Chinese and Japanese myth

Beppyo shrines
Kanpei-taisha
The gardens at Matsuo Taisha were Shigemori's last project; his son, Kanto, supervised the final work after Shigemori's death on March 12, 1975.

Images

See also
List of Shinto shrines
Twenty-Two Shrines
Modern system of ranked Shinto Shrines

Notes

References
 Breen, John and Mark Teeuwen. (2000).  Shinto in History: Ways of the Kami. Honolulu: University of Hawaii Press. 
 Ponsonby-Fane, Richard. (1962).   Studies in Shinto and Shrines. Kyoto: Ponsonby Memorial Society. 
 . (1959).  The Imperial House of Japan. Kyoto: Ponsonby Memorial Society.

External links
Official Site 
Official Site 

Buildings and structures completed in the 8th century
Shinto shrines in Kyoto
Gardens in Kyoto Prefecture
Important Cultural Properties of Japan